Oliver Nelson Plays Michelle is an album by American jazz composer, arranger and saxophonist Oliver Nelson, featuring solos by Nelson and Phil Woods, recorded in 1966 for the Impulse! label.

Reception
The Allmusic review by Douglas Payne awarded the album 2, stars stating: "This is an album of short, often corny tunes and brief, likable solos."

Track listing
 "Island Virgin" (Duke Ellington, Billy Strayhorn) - 3:29
 "These Boots Are Made for Walkin'" (Lee Hazlewood) - 2:51
 "Jazz Bug" (Oliver Nelson) - 3:05
 "Together Again" (Buck Owens) - 3:07
 "Flowers on the Wall"  (Lew DeWitt) - 2:35
 "Yesterday" (John Lennon, Paul McCartney) - 2:44
 "Once Upon a Time" (Johnny Hodges) - 3:36
 "Michelle" (Lennon, McCartney) - 2:29
 "Do You See What I See?" (George Douglas, Oliver Nelson, George David Weiss) - 2:46
 "Fantastic, That's You" (George Cates, George Douglas) - 2:59
 "Beautiful Music" (Douglas, Weiss) - 2:19
 "(Land of Meadows) Meadowland" (Gusser, Knipper, Rome, Sirmay) - 2:49
Recorded at Van Gelder Studio on April 13, 1966 (tracks 1, 2, 5, 7, 10 & 11), and April 14, 1966 (tracks 3, 4, 6, 8, 9 & 12)

Personnel
Tracks 1, 2, 5, 7, 10 & 11
Oliver Nelson - alto saxophone, tenor saxophone, arranger, conductor
Clark Terry, Snooky Young - trumpet, flugelhorn
Phil Woods - alto saxophone
Romeo Penque - tenor saxophone, alto flute
Danny Bank - baritone saxophone
Hank Jones - piano
Billy Butler - guitar, electric bass
Al Lucas - electric guitar
Bob Cranshaw -  bass
Grady Tate – drums
Bobby Rosengarden - percussion
Tracks 3, 4, 6, 8, 9 & 12
Oliver Nelson - alto saxophone, tenor saxophone, arranger, conductor
Clark Terry, Snooky Young, Joe Newman - trumpet, flugelhorn
Phil Woods - alto saxophone
Jerome Richardson - tenor saxophone, flute, alto flute
Danny Bank - baritone saxophone
Hank Jones - piano
Barry Galbraith - guitar
Richard Davis - bass
Grady Tate – drums
Bobby Rosengarden - percussion

References

Impulse! Records albums
Oliver Nelson albums
1966 albums
Albums produced by Bob Thiele
Albums conducted by Oliver Nelson
Albums arranged by Oliver Nelson
Albums recorded at Van Gelder Studio